is a 1995 Japanese animated romantic drama film directed by Yoshifumi Kondō and written by Hayao Miyazaki based on the 1989 manga of the same name by Aoi Hiiragi. It was animated by Studio Ghibli for Tokuma Shoten, Nippon Television Network and Hakuhodo. The film stars Yoko Honna, Issei Takahashi, Takashi Tachibana, Shigeru Muroi, Shigeru Tsuyuguchi and Keiju Kobayashi. 

Whisper of the Heart was Kondō's only film as director before his death in 1998. Studio Ghibli had hoped that Kondō would become the successor to Miyazaki and Isao Takahata.

A spin-off film, The Cat Returns, was released in 2002, which focused on a minor character of the film, the Baron.

Plot

Shizuku Tsukishima is a 14-year-old student at Mukaihara Junior High School, where she is best friends with Yūko Harada. She lives in Tokyo with her parents Asako and Seiya and older sister Shiho, and is keen on creative writing. One evening, she looks through the checkout cards in her library books and discovers they were all checked out previously by someone named Seiji Amasawa.

Over the next few days, she encounters a boy who annoys her by teasing her about "Concrete Roads", a set of original lyrics describing Tama New Town that Shizuku based on the song "Take Me Home, Country Roads". Finding a cat riding a train, Shizuku follows it to discover an antique shop run by Shirō Nishi. In the shop is a cat statuette nicknamed The Baron. Shizuku is ecstatic about finding "a place where stories begin".

Shizuku later encounters the boy again at the antique shop. He shows her the workshop, where she discovers that he is learning to make violins to pursue his dream of becoming a master luthier. She begs him to play the violin for her, but he agrees on the condition that she sings along. The pair perform "Take Me Home, Country Roads". The boy is revealed to be Seiji, Nishi's grandson, and Shizuku and Seiji finally befriend each other.

Seiji admits that he admires Shizuku’s talents and that he had been checking out a large number of books in the hopes that she would eventually notice him. Days after, Seiji leaves for Cremona, Italy for a two-month study with a master violin-maker. Inspired by him pursuing his dream, Shizuku decides to pursue her writing seriously during the two months. She asks Nishi if she can write a story featuring the Baron, to which Nishi grants his consent in exchange for being the first to read her story.

Shizuku concocts a fantasy story featuring herself as the protagonist, the Baron as the male hero looking for his lost love, Louise, and the cat from the train (a neighborhood stray who is, among other names, known as "Moon" and "Muta") as the antagonist. Devoting her time to her writing, Shizuku stays up until early in the morning, and her school grades drop. She argues with her family over her grades and future. As she continues to push herself, her anxiety mounts.

When her story is complete, Nishi reads it and gives his honest assessment. Shizuku bursts into tears as the stress of the last two months turns into relief. Nishi consoles her and tells her the real-life story of the Baron. When he studied in Germany in his youth, he found his first love, a woman named Louise. Nishi discovered the twin statuettes of the Baron and his female companion in a cafe, but as the female one was away for repairs, the shopkeeper would only allow Nishi to buy the Baron if Louise agreed to hold onto its companion so they could be reunited. However, the two lovers and their cat statues were separated during World War II. 

Deciding she needs to learn more about writing, and that she wants to attend high school, Shizuku announces to her mother that she will resume studying for her high school entrance exams. The next morning, she wakes up and sees Seiji outside on his bicycle, having returned a day earlier. Seiji tells Shizuku he will return to Cremona after attending high school in Tokyo.

The two ride Seiji's bike to a lookout and watch the sunrise, where Seiji professes his love for Shizuku and proposes that they marry in the future; she happily accepts.

Voice cast 

For the English dub, Cary Elwes reprised his role as the Baron from The Cat Returns: while The Cat Returns is a spin-off of Whisper of the Heart, its English dub was produced before the latter film saw an American release.

Background

Whisper of the Heart was based on the manga Mimi o Sumaseba which was originally created by Aoi Hiiragi. The manga was serialized in Shueisha's shōjo manga magazine Ribon between August and November 1989, and a single tankōbon volume was released on February 20, 1990. The volume was reprinted on July 15, 2005. A second manga by the same author titled Mimi o Sumaseba: Shiawase na Jikan was serialized in Shueisha's Ribon Original in August 1995 and released in a single volume on February 20, 1996. A spiritual sequel to this film adaption, The Cat Returns, was turned back into a manga by Aoi Hiiragi, under the name Baron: Neko no Danshaku.

Production
During production, the backgrounds in the fantasy sequences of the film were drawn by Naohisa Inoue and the woodcut of the imprisoned violin-maker was created by Miyazaki's son Keisuke Miyazaki, a professional engraver.

Music

The film score of Whisper of the Heart was composed by Yuji Nomi. At times during the film, Shizuku translates John Denver's song "Take Me Home, Country Roads" to Japanese for her school's chorus club. She writes her own humorous Japanese version of the song, called "Concrete Road," about her hometown in western Tokyo. The songs were actually translated by producer Toshio Suzuki's daughter Mamiko with Hayao Miyazaki writing supplemental lyrics. These songs play a role at points in the story. A recording of "Take Me Home, Country Roads," performed by Olivia Newton-John, plays during the film's opening sequence. The song was also performed by Shizuku's voice actress Yoko Honna.

Setting
The movie is set around Seiseki-Sakuragaoka station in Tama city, Tokyo, where Shizuku goes up and down stairs and where she and Seiji declare their love on top of the hill near the station. There are paper fortunes at the shrine where this scene takes place. There are three shops where fans of the movie go to meet.

Release
Whisper of the Heart was released in Japan on July 15, 1995, as the first film in the country to use the Dolby Digital sound format. It was shown alongside the music video On Your Mark for the song by Chage and Aska. The film was released on VHS and Laserdisc by Tokuma Shoten in January 1996, and the VHS was later reissued by Buena Vista Home Entertainment Japan on July 25, 1997 as part of the "Ghibli ga Ippai" series. The movie later saw a DVD release on May 24, 2002, and was soon reissued again with a new HD master by Disney on April 20, 2022.

On July 20, 2011, Walt Disney Studios Japan released the movie on Blu-Ray.

English release
An English dub of this film was produced by Walt Disney Pictures in 2003, but it wouldn't be released until March 7, 2006, when it came out on DVD. Turner Classic Movies televised both the dubbed and subbed versions on January 19, 2006 as part of their month-long celebration of Miyazaki in honor of his birthday, January 5. The reason for the long delay was due to rights issues surrounding "Take Me Home, Country Roads", as it's a major plot point in the movie.

The English title, Whisper of the Heart, was created by Studio Ghibli and used on several officially licensed "character goods" released around the same time as the film was released in theaters in Japan.

The North American Blu-ray was released by Walt Disney Studios Home Entertainment on May 22, 2012, alongside Castle in the Sky and The Secret World of Arrietty. GKIDS & Shout! Factory re-issued the film on Blu-ray and DVD on January 16, 2018 under a new deal with Studio Ghibli.

Reception
Whisper of the Heart  was the highest-grossing Japanese film on the domestic market in 1995, earning  in distribution income, and grossing  in total box office revenue. It grossed $34.9 million worldwide.

The review aggregator Rotten Tomatoes reported that 94% of critics have given the film a positive review based on 17 reviews, with an average rating of 7.6/10. On Metacritic, the film has a weighted average score of 75 out of 100 based on 4 critic reviews, indicating "generally favorable reviews". Time Out London included Whisper of the Heart in their Top 50 Animated Film list. It was also included in Film4's Top 25 Animated Film list. On Anime News Network, Michael Toole gave it an overall grade of A−, calling it "beautiful and evocative; a fine tale of adolescent yearning and aspiration."

General producer and screenwriter Hayao Miyazaki defended the film's ending, saying that it was his idea. Miyazaki wanted Shizuku and Seiji to "commit to something."

Spin-off
Over the course of the film, Shizuku is working on a fantasy novel that revolves around a cat figurine, named The Baron, which she discovers in Mr. Nishi's antique store. In 2002, Studio Ghibli produced a spin-off film The Cat Returns, directed by Hiroyuki Morita and again featuring The Baron, and the stray cat, Muta, in the film. Later on, Muta and the crow (Toto, who is friends with him and the Baron) seem to appear in The Secret World of Arrietty as two skirmishing animals.

Sequel

In January 2020, Sony Pictures Entertainment announced that there will be a live-action film sequel. The film stars Nana Seino as Shizuku and Tori Matsuzaka as Seiji. Yūichirō Hirakawa will direct. It was released on October 14, 2022, after being postponed from its original release date of September 2020 due to the COVID-19 pandemic.

References

External links
 
 
 
 
 

1995 anime films
1990s children's animated films
1990s Japanese-language films
1995 romantic drama films
1990s musical films
Animated coming-of-age films
Animated drama films
Animated musical films
Animated romance films
Animated films about cats
Anime films based on manga
Drama anime and manga
Films directed by Yoshifumi Kondō
Films set in 1995
Films set in Tokyo
Films with screenplays by Hayao Miyazaki
Japanese musical drama films
Japanese romantic musical films
Japanese romantic drama films
Shueisha franchises
Studio Ghibli animated films
Toho animated films
Films set in Japan
1995 films
Films scored by Yuji Nomi